Nandwal (نندوال) is a village in Gujrat District, Punjab, Pakistan. Punjabi is the mother tongue of the village community, though most of the people, especially the youth, can speak Urdu, the national language of Pakistan. The village comprises mainly Chib cast of Rajpoot clan. People wear Shalwar qameez though many old people wear dhoti too. Wheat is the main crop and farming is the most important occupation of the people. This is called 'kanak'in Punjabi. The village has a central mosque named Masjid Gulzar e Habib. There is also a very famous shrine (Khanqah). 

Populated places in Gujrat District